Allyn Joslyn (July 21, 1901 – January 21, 1981) was an American stage, radio, television and film actor, known for his roles playing aristocratic wealthy snobs.

Biography
Allyn Joslyn was born in Milford, Pennsylvania, the son of a mining engineer. On stage from age 17, Joslyn scored as a leading man in such Broadway productions as Boy Meets Girl (1936) and Arsenic and Old Lace (1941), appearing in the latter as beleaguered theatrical critic Mortimer Brewster. Apart from a single appearance in a 1930 Vitaphone movie short, Joslyn confined his work to the stage until moving to Hollywood in 1937. Hollywood didn't see Joslyn as a leading-man type. Thus, he spent most of his film career playing comic character roles: obnoxious reporters, weaklings, and formless "other men" who never got the girl, while stars such as James Cagney and Cary Grant took the roles he originated on Broadway.

Among his more notable film appearances were as the tough pilot in Only Angels Have Wings (1939); George in The Great McGinty (1940); the opportunistic wastrel in If I Had My Way (1940); the caustic director in No Time for Comedy (1940); the reporter in My Sister Eileen (1942); Albert Van Cleve, Don Ameche's cousin and snobbish rival for the affections of Gene Tierney in Heaven Can Wait (1943); an eccentric poet in The Shocking Miss Pilgrim; the flippant crime-fiction author in Dangerous Blondes (1943); the wise sheriff in Moonrise (1948); the card shark disguised as a woman in Titanic (1953), and the star-struck father of a showgirl in I Love Melvin (1953). He played the occasional lead on screen, including in Strange Affair (1944) opposite Evelyn Keyes, and the sprightly B picture It Shouldn't Happen to a Dog (1946), as Carole Landis's love interest.

A prolific radio and television performer, Joslyn was a co-star of the 1953–1954 ABC sitcom Where's Raymond?, in which he played Jonathan Wallace, brother of the title character Raymond Wallace, the role of Ray Bolger. Betty Lynn played June Wallace, Joslyn's young wife in the series. Joslyn and Lynn left the series in the 1954–1955 series, when it was renamed The Ray Bolger Show.

In 1957, Joslyn co-starred in eight episodes as literary agent George Howell in the short-lived CBS sitcom The Eve Arden Show. He also guest-starred in the NBC western series The Californians. In 1959, he was cast as Quag in the episode "Gold Sled" of the ABC/Warner Brothers western series The Alaskans, starring Roger Moore. In the 1960–1961 season, Joslyn guest-starred on Pat O'Brien's ABC sitcom Harrigan and Son. He played a pompous colonel in the 1962 TV sitcom McKeever And The Colonel. That same year, he guest-starred in ABC's crime drama series Target: The Corruptors with Stephen McNally and Robert Harland. He was featured as well in some episodes of ABC's The Addams Family as the beleaguered Sam L. Hilliard, whose efforts as a school administrator and politician were continually undone by the Addams family.

Personal life 
In 1935, he married Dorothy Yockel. They remained married until her death in 1978 and had one daughter.

Death 
On January 21, 1981, Allyn Joslyn died of heart failure at the Motion Picture & Television Country House and Hospital in Woodland Hills in Los Angeles, California, at the age of 79. He is interred at Forest Lawn Memorial Park in the Hollywood Hills of Los Angeles.

Partial filmography

They Won't Forget (1937) - Bill Brock
Expensive Husbands (1937) - Joe Craig
Hollywood Hotel (1937) - Bernie Walton
The Shining Hour (1938) - Roger Q. Franklin
Sweethearts (1938) - Dink
Cafe Society (1939) - Sonny De Witt
Only Angels Have Wings (1939) - Les Peters
Fast and Furious (1939) - Ted Bentley
If I Had My Way (1940) - Jarvis Johnson
The Great McGinty (1940) - George
No Time for Comedy (1940) - Morgan Carrell
Spring Parade (1940) - Count Zorndorf
This Thing Called Love (1940) - Harry Bertrand
I Wake Up Screaming (1941) - Larry Evans
Bedtime Story (1941) - William Dudley
The Wife Takes a Flyer (aka A Yank In Dutch) (1942) - Major Zellfritz
The Affairs of Martha (1942) - Joel Archer
My Sister Eileen (1942) - Chic Clark
Immortal Sergeant (1943) - Cassidy
Young Ideas (1943) - Adam Trent
Heaven Can Wait (1943) - Albert Van Cleve
Dangerous Blondes (1943) - Barry Craig
The Impostor (1944) - Bouteau
Bride by Mistake (1944) - Phil Vernon
Sweet and Low-Down (1944) - Lester Barnes
Strange Affair (1944) - Bill Harrison
The Horn Blows at Midnight (1945) - Second Trumpeter / Osidro
Junior Miss (1945) - Harry Graves
Colonel Effingham's Raid (1946) - Earl Hoats
It Shouldn't Happen to a Dog (1946) - Henry Barton
The Thrill of Brazil (1946) - John Habour
The Shocking Miss Pilgrim (1947) - Leander Woolsey
If You Knew Susie (1948) - Mike Garrett
Moonrise (1948) - Sheriff Clem Otis
The Lady Takes a Sailor (1949) - Ralph Whitcomb
Harriet Craig (1950) - Billy Birkmire
As Young as You Feel (1951) - George Hodges
The Jazz Singer (1952) - George Miller
I Love Melvin (1953) - Frank Schneider
Titanic (1953) - Earl Meeker
Island in the Sky (1953) - J.H. Handy
The Fastest Gun Alive (1956) - Harvey Maxwell
You Can't Run Away from It (1956) - Joe Gordon, Editor
Public Pigeon No. 1 (1957) - Harvey Baker
Nightmare in the Sun (1965) - Rock Club leader
The Brothers O'Toole (1973) - Sheriff Ed Hatfield (final film role)

References

External links

 
 
 

1901 births
1981 deaths
People from Milford, Pennsylvania
Male actors from Pennsylvania
American male film actors
American male stage actors
American male television actors
Burials at Forest Lawn Memorial Park (Hollywood Hills)
20th-century American male actors
Chestnut Hill Academy alumni